Cyril Neveu (born 20 September 1956 in Orléans, France) is a French former professional motocross, enduro and rally raid racer. He is notable for winning the motorcycle division of the Dakar Rally five times in 1979, 1980, 1982, 1986, and 1987. He was the first competitor to win the Dakar Rally in the motorcycle category in 1979. In 2013, Neveu was named an FIM Legend for his motorcycling achievements.

References 

1956 births
Living people
Off-road racing drivers
Dakar Rally motorcyclists
Dakar Rally winning drivers
Enduro riders
Off-road motorcycle racers
Sportspeople from Orléans